Great Barr is now a large and loosely defined area to the north-west of Birmingham, England. The area was historically in Staffordshire, and the parts now in Birmingham were once known as Perry Barr, which is still the name of an adjacent Birmingham district. Other areas known as Great Barr are in the Metropolitan Boroughs of Walsall and Sandwell.

"Barr" means "hill", and the name refers to nearby Barr Beacon.

History

Samuel Taylor, an itinerant Methodist preacher, visited Great Barr in 1792 and remarked "preached at Barr, a village famous for nothing as having given birth to Francis Asbury of America and being the present residence of his parents, at whose house we preached".

Great Barr was largely rural until the early 20th century, though it was influenced by the early stages of the industrial revolution which affected the nearby towns of Birmingham and the Black Country. The Staffordshire parish of Barr straddled the route from Birmingham to Walsall.  Birmingham's historian William Hutton was surprised to see so many nail-making workshops in the area. He noted that "in some of these workshops I observed one, or more, females, stripped of their upper garments, and not overcharged with the lower, wielding the hammer with all the grace of their sex".

At that time the area was on the main drovers' routes which saw trains of horses taking coal from Walsall and Wednesbury to the factories and furnaces of Birmingham. At the Scott Arms there was a weekly cattle market which attracted large crowds. The Scott Arms and the Malt Shovel public house in Newton, did a roaring trade with drunkenness, cockfighting, and gambling common. Francis Asbury referred to it as "a dark place called Great Barre"

The rural economy was dominated by four great landowning families, the Wryley Birches, Dartmouths, Scotts and Goughs. The parish was series of tiny hamlets:  Howell's Row, Sneal's Green, Newton, Margaret's Lane, Queslett, the Common, Bourn Pool, Bourn Vale, the Tamworth Road, the Gough Arms Inn (later called the Beacon Inn) and around Barr Hall In 1817 there were 120 houses occupied by 127 families, 78 of whom were engaged in agriculture and 30 in trade. These trades included a tailor, boarding house owner, a wheelwright, a butcher, a grocer, who doubled as a constable, a shoemaker, two brick makers, a maltster, gun lock maker, three blacksmiths, and four spectacle frame makers.

The 1901 census recorded a population of 1,344, by 1921 this had increased to 2,232. By 1930 the population had grown to 3,294, by 1951, despite the war, it had reached 12,648. In 2015 the two local government wards in the Metropolitan Borough of Sandwell, which now cover much of Great Barr, had a combined electorate of 18,840 adults.
 
The urban district of Perry Barr was ceded to Birmingham, then in Warwickshire, in 1928.

By the outbreak of the Second World War in 1939 it was a very busy residential area with good road connections to West Bromwich, Walsall and Birmingham.

Expansion continued after the war, and during the 1960s the area received a motorway link when Junction 7 of the newly built M6 motorway was opened on the A34. It is also located close to the starting point of the M5, which can be accessed just one mile (1.6 km) northwards on the M6.

On 11 August 1975, eight-year-old local schoolgirl Helen Bailey was found dead from a single knife wound, in woods near Booths Farm. Her killer was never found.

Kidnapper Michael Sams abducted estate agent Stephanie Slater from a house in Turnberry Road, Great Barr before holding her for eight days in January 1992. Following receipt of £175,000 ransom, Sams released her. Police arrested him three weeks later and he was sentenced to life imprisonment for abducting Slater and murdering Leeds prostitute Julie Dart.

Geography
The traditional centre of Great Barr is focussed on the busy junction of the A34 and A4041 roads, at the Scott Arms public house and shopping centre. This is named after the Scott family of Great Barr Hall, which was once home of Samuel Galton and a meeting place of the Lunar Society.

However, the name is also loosely applied to a swathe of the West Midlands bounded by junction 8 of the M6 motorway in the west, the Birmingham – Walsall railway line (part of the former Grand Junction Railway, opened in 1837, and including Hamstead railway station, formerly called Great Barr station) and Perry Barr to the south, Kingstanding to the east, and the open countryside of Barr Beacon to the north.

Great Barr includes much of the B42, B43 and B44 postcode areas.

Places of interest
Bishop Asbury Cottage (incorrectly named as "Bishop Ashbury's Cottage" on Ordnance Survey maps), was where Francis Asbury, the first American Methodist Bishop, was raised. It is owned by Sandwell Council and is Grade II listed. It is open by appointment for group visits, and opens occasionally to the general public.

Great Barr Hall is a Grade II* listed building, and due its current state of disrepair is not open to the public. St. Margaret's Church stands nearby.

Red House Park is open to the public and provides important amenities for the local community. It is owned by the Sandwell Council. In the grounds are both the Red House itself and an obelisk erected in memory of Princess Charlotte who died in childbirth in November 1817. The Red House, a country house also used a convalescent home, and then a community centre, is Grade II listed building, but is no longer open to the public, having been sold in 2015 and converted to residential apartments.

Birmingham Canal Navigations' Tame Valley Canal runs through Great Barr, from Piercy Aqueduct at Hamstead, along a cutting in 200-million year old sandstone, under Freeth bridge at Tower Hill, under the A34 and into Perry Barr Locks at Perry Barr.

Great Barr's notable current and former residents

 Steve Adey – Musician was born in Great Barr and attended Great Barr School
 Francis Asbury (1745–1816) – one of the first two bishops of the Methodist Episcopal Church in the U.S.A.
 Helen Bailey, an eight-year-old schoolgirl who was killed in 1975
 John Bainbridge, – Writer, attended Hamstead Primary School, Grove Vale School and Dartmouth Comprehensive
 William Booth, – Forger. Booths Farm Road and Booths Lane are named after him.
 Mike Burney, – Musician from Wizzard, attended at Hamstead Junior School and Churchfields Comprehensive
 James Michael Curtin, - professional wrestler better known as Rockstar Spud
 Cat Deeley, – TV presenter, actress and former model, attended Grove Vale Primary School and Dartmouth High School
 Mark "Barney" Greenway, – Singer of Napalm Death, born in Great Barr.
 Keith Law, – Songwriter for Velvett Fogg attended Hamstead Junior School and Churchfields High School Comprehensive
 Vaughan Lowe, – Lawyer and Oxford professor, attended Hamstead Primary School
 Keith Linnecor, - Labour Councillor for Oscott Ward for 25 years
 Geoff Morris, – professional football player for Walsall, Shrewsbury Town and Port Vale, was born in Great Barr
 Dhani Prem, – Padma Shri winner and the first Asian Councillor to represent Great Barr in 1946.
 Martin Shaw, – Actor, attended Great Barr School
 Dean Smith, Former Walsall football player and manager, former head coach of Aston Villa and Norwich City, born in Great Barr and attended Dartmouth High School.
 Jeff Smith, – motocross world champion 1964 & 1965, born in Colne, Lancashire
 Andrew 'Beans' Medlicott, - First back to back winner of Birmingham's tallest man, 2016-2017.
 Dave Swarbrick, – Musician, attended Great Barr School
 Steve Winwood, – Musician, attended Great Barr School, born in Handsworth
 Chris Woakes, – Cricketer for Warwickshire and England attended Barr Beacon School
 Gillian Wearing – Artist, Turner Prize Winner

Education 
Great Barr is well served with a number of primary and secondary schools.
Great Barr School is the largest single-site school in the country with over 2,400 pupils on roll.

Primary schools
 Barr View Primary School
 Beeches Infant School
 Beeches Junior School
 Calshot Primary School
 Dorrington Road Primary school
 Ferndale Primary School
 Glenmead Primary School
 Greenholm Primary School
 Grove Vale Primary School
 Hamstead Infant School
 Hamstead Junior School
 Holy Name RC Primary School
 St Margarets CE Primary School
 St Mark's RC Primary School
 Whitecrest Primary School
 Meadow View Primary School
 Pheasey Park Farm Primary School

Secondary schools
 Fortis Academy is a mixed school catering for children aged 11 to 19.
 Arena Academy is a mixed academy catering for children aged 11 to 16.
 Q3 Academy Great Barr (formerly Dartmouth High School) is a mixed academy catering for children aged 11 to 19.
 Barr Beacon School is a mixed school catering for children aged 11 to 19.

Perry Beeches does not have a 'Primary' School it has two separate schools Beeches Infant School and Beeches Junior School.

The Perry Beeches Campus is the largest school campus in Birmingham and houses 5 schools: Perry Beeches Nursery School, Beeches Infant School, Beeches Junior School, Arena Academy and Priestley Smith School for the Visually Impaired.

College

The James Watt campus of Birmingham Metropolitan College is at the junction of Beeches Road and Aldridge Road, at the Old Oscott side of Great Barr. The buildings were originally Brooklyn Technical College.

Bibliography
Asbury, Francis, "The Journal and Letters of Francis Asbury" 1st edition 1821, republished Nashville and London, 1958
Hackworth, F.W., "History of West Bromwich" 1895, republished Studley, 2001
Hallam, David J.A. "Eliza Asbury: her cottage and her son" Studley, 2003 
Hallam, David J.A. "One hundred years of service to Newton: The history of Newton Road United Reformed (Allen Memorial) Church 1917-2017 Smethwick, 2018 
White, William, "The History, Gazetteer and Directory of Staffordshire", Sheffield, 1834
Woodall, Richard, "The Barr Story", Aldridge, undated, (1950?)

References

External links

 Birmingham City Council
 Sandwell Council (includes West Bromwich)
 Walsall Council
 B43 postcode area
 

 
Areas of the West Midlands (county)
Areas of Birmingham, West Midlands
Walsall
West Bromwich